Malick Fall may refer to:

 Malick Fall (footballer) (born 1968), former Senegal international footballer
 Malick Fall (swimmer) (born 1985), Olympic swimmer from Senegal